Trukcharopa trukana is a species of small air-breathing land snails, terrestrial pulmonate gastropod mollusks in the family Charopidae. This species is endemic to Micronesia.

References

Fauna of Micronesia
Trukcharopa
Gastropods described in 1983
Taxonomy articles created by Polbot